Tetrapachylasma is a genus of symmetrical sessile barnacles in the family Pachylasmatidae. There are about five described species in Tetrapachylasma.

Species
These species belong to the genus Tetrapachylasma:
 Tetrapachylasma arcuatum Jones, 2000
 Tetrapachylasma aurantiacum (Darwin, 1854)
 Tetrapachylasma ferrugomaculosa (Jones, 1993)
 Tetrapachylasma ornatum Jones, 2000
 Tetrapachylasma trigonum Foster, 1988

References

External links

 

Barnacles